Legislative elections were held in Mongolia on 30 June 1996. The result was a victory for the Democratic Union Coalition, which won 50 of the 76 seats in the State Great Khural. Voter turnout was 92.1%.

American involvement
The National Endowment for Democracy, a U.S. Government agency, helped unite several political parties, intellectuals, businessmen, students and other activists into the Democratic Union Coalition and then trained them in grassroots campaigning and membership recruiting. They also assisted in distributing 350,000 copies of a manifesto calling for private property rights, a free press and foreign investment to help convince people to vote out the Mongolian People's Revolutionary Party.

Results

References

Mongolia
1996 in Mongolia
Elections in Mongolia